Sampan, also known as San-Ban, is a 1968 film which was the first feature directed, written and co-produced by Terry Bourke. The film was successful at the box office.

Plot
In Hong Kong, the owner of a sampan has two sons, one good and one bad. One son falls in love with his stepmother.

Production
The script was written by Bourke, who was working as a journalist in Hong Kong, He met Gordon Mailloux who agreed to produce.

Release
According to Mailoux, the film was the most successful movie made in Hong Kong that year. Bourke claimed the movie contained the first naked scene in Chinese cinema. It was banned in Taiwan.

References

External links

1968 films
Hong Kong crime drama films
1960s English-language films
Films directed by Terry Bourke